Ernie James Kellerman (also Kellermann) (born December 17, 1943) is a former American football safety in the National Football League (NFL) for the Cleveland Browns, Cincinnati Bengals and the Buffalo Bills. He played college football at Miami University.

Early years
Kellerman played quarterback and defensive back for the St. Peter Chanel High School Firebirds and he was a member of the first graduating class of the school in 1961.

He accepted a scholarship from Miami University, where he was coached by John Pont and Bo Schembechler. He became a three-time All-Mid-American Conference quarterback from 1962 to 1964. He established 14 records and is still Miami University's all-time total offensive leader with 3,978 yards. His biggest game passing came against Houston in the 1962 Tangerine Bowl when he completed 17 of 40 passes for 265 yards.

In his senior year, he set four passing records by completing 88 of 149 passes for 1,260 yards and a completion percentage of .591. His 88-yard touchdown pass enabled Miami to defeat Purdue, 10–7, for the upset of the collegiate football season in 1962.

Professional career
Kellerman was selected by the Dallas Cowboys in the twelfth round (159th overall) of the 1965 NFL Draft. He was converted into a defensive back, but was waived on September 13.

In 1965, he was signed to the taxi squad of his hometown Cleveland Browns based on a recommendation from Schembechler. The next year, he made the team as a safety and played through the 1971 season, recording 17 interceptions over those six seasons. He was named to the Pro Bowl in 1968; he intercepted six passes that year, his highest season total. His lone NFL touchdown came in 1969 on an interception return against the Green Bay Packers. He was released on September 12, 1972.

Kellerman played for Cincinnati Bengals in 1972 and the Buffalo Bills in 1973 before retiring.

References

External links
Cleveland Sports Hall of Fame bio
Cleveland Browns' 100 best all-time players: No. 95

1943 births
Living people
American football quarterbacks
American football safeties
Buffalo Bills players
Cincinnati Bengals players
Miami RedHawks football players
Cleveland Browns players
Eastern Conference Pro Bowl players
People from Bedford, Ohio
Players of American football from Cleveland